The 1993 Pot Black was the third of the revived professional invitational snooker tournament, the 21st series altogether and the last series of Pot Black in its traditional form. Recording took place on 28 August 1993 and broadcast in the autumn of the same year. The tournament was held at Pebble Mill Studios in Birmingham, and had reverted to the traditional format after the 1992 "Timeframe" was unpopular with viewers and players. It featured sixteen professional players in a knock-out system. All matches until the semi-final were one-frame shoot-outs, the semi-final was an aggregate score of two frames and the final being contested over the best of three frames.

Broadcasts were shown on Monday afternoons on BBC1 except the semi-finals and final were for three days and the series started at 15:05 on Monday 6 September 1993. David Vine was the new presenter for the series replacing Eammon Holmes and Ted Lowe remained in the commentary box with some of the players as co-commentators while John Williams refereed the series.

The final was won by Steve Davis beating Mike Hallett 2–0 and winning the Pot Black title for the fourth time beating John Spencer and Eddie Charlton's record of three titles.

Main draw

Final

References

Pot Black
1993 in snooker
1993 in English sport